Dianthus giganteus, the giant pink, is a species of pink native to Romania, the Balkan peninsula, and possibly nearby areas. A perennial with flowerheads reaching 1m, it is useful in gardening and landscaping applications where a backdrop of taller plants is needed. It is available from commercial suppliers, with the Royal Horticultural Society considering it to be a good plant to attract pollinators.

Subspecies
A number of putative subspecies have been proposed:

Dianthus giganteus subsp. banaticus (Heuff.) Tutin
Dianthus giganteus subsp. croaticus (Borbás) Tutin
Dianthus giganteus subsp. giganteus d'Urv.
Dianthus giganteus subsp. haynaldianus (Borbás) Tutin
Dianthus giganteus subsp. italicus Tutin
Dianthus giganteus subsp. subgiganteus (Borbás ex Formánek) Hayek
Dianthus giganteus subsp. vandasii (Velen.) Stoj. & Acht.

References

giganteus
Flora of Southeastern Europe
Garden plants of Europe
Plants described in 1822